Tobon may refer to:
 Spanish surname Tobón
 a Norwegian rename of the MV Empire MacRae